Our Betters is a comedy play by the British writer Somerset Maugham. Set in Mayfair and a country house in Suffolk, the plot revolves around the interaction between newly wealthy Americans and upper-class British society.

It premiered at the Nixon Theatre in Atlantic City, New Jersey before transferring to the Hudson Theatre on Broadway where it ran for 112 performances. It didn't premiere in London immediately, but then enjoyed a very lengthy West End run of 548 performances at the Globe Theatre between 12 September 1923 and 3 January 1925. The London cast included Constance Collier, Ronald Squire, Reginald Owen, John Stuart, Alfred Drayton, Margaret Bannerman and Martita Hunt.

Adaptation
In 1933 it was made into a film of the same title by the Hollywood studio RKO. Directed by George Cukor and starring Constance Bennett, Anita Louise and Gilbert Roland.

References

Bibliography
 Goble, Alan. The Complete Index to Literary Sources in Film. Walter de Gruyter, 1999.
 Hastings, Selina. The Secret Lives of Somerset Maugham: A Biography. Simon and Schuster, 2012.
 Wearing, J.P. The London Stage 1920-1929: A Calendar of Productions, Performers, and Personnel. Rowman & Littlefield, 2014.

1917 plays
West End plays
Broadway plays
American plays
British plays adapted into films
Comedy plays
Plays by W. Somerset Maugham
Plays set in London